This is the discography of American R&B/soul vocal group The Stylistics.

Albums

Studio albums

 Heavy was released under the title From the Mountain in the UK.

Compilation albums

Singles

References

Rhythm and blues discographies
Discographies of American artists